William Wegman may refer to:

 Bill Wegman (William Edward Wegman, born 1962), American baseball player
 William Wegman (photographer) (born 1943), American artist